Krypskyttere (Poachers) is a Norwegian drama film from 1982 directed by Hans Otto Nicolayssen. the film deals with a conflict between the military and the civilian population over the rights to a military firing range. The Cold War is the backdrop for the story. The main roles are played by Jon Eivind Gullord, Hans Rotmo, Per Gørvell and Nils Gaup. The film is in black and white.

Plot
Martin, who is doing his military service, is sent out for shooting practice with his squad in his own hometown. Disputes between the locals and the military over the use of a firing range create loyalty conflicts for Martin. The villagers, led by Martin's father, disagree with the military about the right to use the area. International politics also comes into play when the US military wants to deploy missile silos for nuclear weapons in the forest.

Reception
The newspapers Verdens Gang and Dagbladet gave the film a "die throw" of three out of six.

Cast

 Jon Eivind Gullord as Martin Buer, a soldier
 Hans Rotmo as Bent Tangen, a soldier
 Per Gørvell as Alf Sørensen, a soldier
 Nils Gaup as Kåre, a soldier
 Kim Kalsås as Toni, a soldier
 Jo Tore Bæverfjord as Jo-Tore, a soldier
 Karl Sundby as Knut Lie, a soldier
 Hans Jacob Sand as Knut's friend
 Svein Roger Karlsen as Knut's friend
 Lasse Kolsrud as Tom, a soldier
 Kjell Stormoen as Lieutenant Colonel Strand
 Bjarne Hjelde as Lieutenant Solberg
 Erik Hivju as Berg, a sergeant
 Knut Haugmark as Halvorsen, a lieutenant
 Janken Varden as Hagen, a major
 Bob Sherman as Streufert, a major
 Hayes Burnett as Lieutenant Jones
 Eldar Vågan as Johan Lunden
 Ivar Aaserud as a photographer
 Nina Benan as Lise
 Roy Bjørnstad as Olaf Buer
 Jens Bolling as Arthur Skjolden
 Jappa Calmeyer as Kurre
 Erling Engh as a soldier
 Odd Furøy as Torp, the sheriff
 Anne Mette Grønland as Lise
 David A. Grønli as Karl Holt
 Eli Anne Linnestad as the journalist
 Hans Kr. Medlien as Åmund Gardslie
 Hans Kristian Østbye as a soldier
 Karen Randers-Pehrson as Gudrun
 Espen Skjønberg as Tandberg
 Håkon Sparre as Tore
 Unni Torgersen as Turid

References

External links 
 
 Krypskyttere at the National Library of Norway
 Krypskyttere at the Swedish Film Database

1982 films
Cold War films
Films about nuclear war and weapons
1980s Norwegian-language films
Films set in Norway